"Hands" is a song by Swedish DJ Mike Perry,  British band The Vamps and American singer Sabrina Carpenter. It was released on 19 May 2017 by DF Records and Sony Music. The song was written by Brad Simpson, Connor Ball, Tristan Evans, James McVey, George Tizzard, Rick Parkhouse, Samuel Preston, Rachel Furner, Mikael Persson, Dimitri Vangelis and Andreas Wiman and produced by Red Triangle, Persson, Vangelis and Wiman. Lyrically, the deep house, pop and tropical house song talks about thinking of a person you want to have a physical contact. It was third single from their third studio album, Night & Day (Night Edition) (2017).

Background and recording 
The song was described as "upbeat with inexplicable energy."

The first time Carpenter used profanity in a song, the word "shit" in one of her verses in the song was misunderstood. "Shirt" was originally written in the lyrics but Carpenter sang "shit" instead, as she had not seen the lyrics but only heard the demo. James McVey of The Vamps only told her about the lyrics after the song was released. When asked by Carpenter on why the word was "shirt", McVey said "Well, in the first verse it goes, 'drop that dress to the floor', so she would say 'leave your shirt at the door'."

The song was written in 2017 by Brad Simpson, Connor Ball, Tristan Evans, James McVey, George Tizzard, Rick Parkhouse, Samuel Preston, Rachel Furner, Mikael Persson, Dimitri Vangelis and Andreas Wiman and produced by Red Triangle, Persson, Vangelis and Wiman. The song's vocalists are Simpson and Sabrina Carpenter. The song was mixed and recorded by Persson and was mastered by Dick Beetham at 360 Mastering in London. The bass guitar was played by Ball and Parkhouse while drums were played by Evans. Parkhouse programmed the track and provided additional vocals with Furner, Tizzard and Preston. Clapping was provided by Furner and Preston while Tizzard played piano. Tizzard and McVey play guitar on the track.

Live performances
The song was performed by The Vamps on their Middle of the Night Tour, alongside Carpenter, who toured together with them as a supporting act.

Credits and personnel
Recording and management
 Mastered at 360 Mastering (London, United Kingdom)
 Global Talent Publishing, Warner/Chappell Music Publishing, B-Unique/Spirit Publishing, Universal/Jem Music Publishing, Global/Spirit Publishing, Ten Music Publishing, Copyright Control

Personnel

 Brad Simpson – vocals, songwriting
Sabrina Carpenter – vocals
 Connor Ball – songwriting, bass guitar
 Tristan Evans – songwriting, drums
 James McVey – songwriting, guitar
George Tizzard – songwriting, guitar, piano, additional vocals
Rick Parkhouse – songwriting, bass, programming, additional vocals
Samuel Preston – songwriting, clapping, additional vocals
Rachel Furner – songwriting, clapping, additional vocals
Mikael Persson – songwriting, production, mixing, recording
Dimitri Vangelis – songwriting, production
Andreas Wiman – songwriting, production
Red Triangle – production
Dick Beetham – mastering

Credits adapted from Night & Day (Night Edition) and Tidal liner notes.

Track listing

Charts

Certifications

Release history

References

2017 songs
2017 singles
Electronic songs
Sabrina Carpenter songs
The Vamps (British band) songs
Tropical house songs
Songs written by Preston (singer)
Songs written by Tich (singer)
Songs written by Rick Parkhouse
Songs written by George Tizzard
Song recordings produced by Red Triangle (production team)